Akuapem North is one of the constituencies represented in the Parliament of Ghana.It elects one Member of Parliament (MP) by the first past the post system of election. Nana Ama Dokua Asiamah Adjei is the member of parliament for the constituency. She was elected on the ticket of the New Patriotic Party (NPP) won a majority of 26,655 votes.

Members of Parliament

Boundaries
The seat is located entirely within the Akuapem North Municipal Assembly of the Eastern Region of Ghana.

References 

Parliamentary constituencies in the Eastern Region (Ghana)